Arkansas Highway 290 (AR 290 and Hwy. 290) is an east–west state highway in Garland County, Arkansas. The route of  runs from Highway 7 near Lake Hamilton east to Arkansas Highway 171 in Lake Catherine State Park.

Route description

The route begins at Highway 7 in south Garland County near Lake Hamilton and runs east. The highway serves as a northern terminus for Highway 128 and continues east to give access to boat ramps and docks. After serving the unincorporated community of Red Oak, the route meets another alignment of AR 128. This segment runs north to enter Hot Springs State Park. The highway continues east to enter Lake Catherine State Park, ending at Highway 171.

Major intersections

See also

 List of state highways in Arkansas

References

External links

290
Transportation in Garland County, Arkansas